Nicolosi is a comune (municipality) in the Metropolitan City of Catania in the Italian region Sicily, located about  southeast of Palermo and about  northwest of Catania.

Nicolosi borders the following municipalities: Adrano, Belpasso, Biancavilla, Bronte, Castiglione di Sicilia, Maletto, Mascalucia, Pedara, Randazzo, Sant'Alfio, Zafferana Etnea.

Twin towns — sister cities
Nicolosi is twinned with:
  Edremit, Turkey since 2010

References

External links
 Official website

Cities and towns in Sicily